The Honda CB250F also known as the Honda Hornet 250 is a standard motorcycle which was launched by Honda in 1996. It was initially only available in Japan, as a domestic model but was made available to the rest of the world as a grey import. Powered by a de-tuned version of the inline-four engine from the CBR250, it produces around 40 PS at 14,000 rpm to its redline of 16,000 rpm. This tuning allows the engine to provide more useful low-end power. The bike features a 6-speed transmission and a 16-litre fuel tank and in later models, a dual-tone coloured exterior. This bike is said to emit a peculiar high-pitched whine due to the gear driven camshafts used inside the engine.

Following reception from the Japanese market, the CB600F Hornet and CB900F Hornet were made available to the markets outside Japan.

2014 CB250F and CB300F
In 2014, Honda launched the entirely new single-cylinder CB250F (without the "Hornet" name), which is based on the CBR250R sport bike. Honda also launched the 287 cc version for the developed markets, called the CB300F, which is based on the CBR300R.

See also	
 Honda Hornet (disambiguation)

References

1. http://www.hondahornet.co.uk/250spec.html 
2.(Japanese) http://www.honda.co.jp/news/1996/2960125sp.html
3. (English) http://world.honda.com/news/1998/2980929.html
4.(Japanese) http://www.honda.co.jp/news/2006/2061220-hornet.html
5. (Sinhalese) https://web.archive.org/web/20150206225320/http://forum.motorbikelk.com/index.php?topic=17.0

CB250F
Standard motorcycles
Motorcycles introduced in 1996